St. Joseph Cathedral  is a Catholic cathedral located in Columbus, Ohio, United States which serves as the seat of the Diocese of Columbus. The church building, completed in 1878, is located on Broad Street in Downtown Columbus

History

St. Joseph Parish, named after Saint Joseph, Jesus' legal father, was founded by members of St. Patrick’s Parish in Columbus in 1866 to alleviate overcrowding. Its pastor, the Rev. Edward M. Fitzgerald, began to plan for the church, raised money, formed a building committee and secured property on Broad Street and Fifth for $13,500.  The committee chose name St. Joseph for the new church, and selected Michael Harding as architect.  Contractor John McCabe began construction June 6, 1866 with John Stoddard engaged as mason.  Auxiliary Bishop Sylvester H. Rosecrans of Cincinnati laid the cornerstone November 11, 1866.

In 1867, Father Fitzgerald became Bishop of Little Rock and Rosecrans succeeded him as pastor of St. Patrick’s. On March 3, 1868, Pope Pius IX established the Diocese of Columbus and named Rosecrans as its first bishop.  He selected St. Joseph’s as the cathedral for the new diocese.

Rosecrans named Robert T. Brookes to succeed Harding as architect and altered the original design of a brick structure to stone, specifically boasted ashlar quarried from Licking and Fairfield counties  to befit its elevated status as a cathedral. Because of this, workers demolished the existing foundation walls rebuilt them deeper.  Retired General William Rosecrans, older brother of the bishop, came to Columbus to assist with some of the design plans in the summer of 1870.

Rosecrans celebrated the first Mass in the unfinished cathedral on Christmas 1872. Soon after, Cardinal John McCloskey of New York donated marble, from the same quarry used in the construction of St. Patrick's Cathedral, New York, to construct a high altar and side altars. In 1873, parish purchased the home of Joseph Gundersheimer, across Broad Street between Sixth and Seventh Streets, to house the clergy.  It served until the diocese could construct a rectory attached to the cathedral.

Even though interior decoration of the building was incomplete, Rosecrans consecrated it on October 20, 1878.  The final cost was $218,000. Rosecrans died the following day.  He was interred directly beneath the main altar.

The cathedral held a Respect Life Mass on January 22, 2021 to commemorate the 48th anniversary of the Roe v. Wade decision, and the liturgy was disrupted by about 8 pro-abortion protestors. Some held signs calling for the repeal of the Hyde Amendment. Representatives from the police and the church escorted the protestors outside. Robert J. Brennan issued a statement, thanking law enforcement and church officials, and the faithful who were present in prayer, saying they reflect "joy, hope, and mercy that marks our pro-life witness."

Architecture

St. Joseph Cathedral was designed in the Gothic Revival style and built of ashlar stone quarried in Licking and Fairfield counties. The Broad Street (south) façade of the cathedral houses three entrances and was to be framed by two towers. Both towers remain incomplete. The Fifth Street façade houses an additional entrance.  
  
In 1914, the diocese remodeled the cathedral replacing the main and side altars and communion rail.  Work also included replacing the iron columns supporting the clearstory, new lighting, and sacristy improvements 

The cathedral saw further changes in 1967 when the lower level was excavated to create a usable meeting space. In June 1978, the sanctuary was updated in an attempt to incorporate changes mandated by the Second Vatican Council.

See also

List of cathedrals in the United States
List of Catholic cathedrals in the United States

References

External links

 
 Roman Catholic Diocese of Columbus
 St. Joseph Cathedral and the American Gothic

1866 establishments in Ohio
Buildings in downtown Columbus, Ohio
Gothic Revival church buildings in Ohio
Religious organizations established in 1866
Joseph Cathedral, Columbus
Roman Catholic churches completed in 1878
Roman Catholic churches in Columbus, Ohio
Columbus Register properties
19th-century Roman Catholic church buildings in the United States
Broad Street (Columbus, Ohio)